Linos is an embedded distribution of Linux with proprietary applications used by Aware Electronics in their A-BOOK products. It can only be obtained by purchasing a device containing the runtime code.
It is used in the Elonex ONE.

References 

Embedded Linux distributions
Linux distributions